Medical evidence can refer to:
 Forensic biology
 Hierarchy of evidence in medical research